Yuliya Vitalyevna Pidluzhnaya (born  October 1, 1988 in Sverdlovsk) is a Russian long jumper.

International competitions

See also
List of people from Yekaterinburg
List of European Athletics Indoor Championships medalists (women)

References

1988 births
Living people
Sportspeople from Yekaterinburg
Russian female long jumpers
World Athletics Championships athletes for Russia
Universiade gold medalists in athletics (track and field)
Universiade gold medalists for Russia
Universiade silver medalists for Russia
Medalists at the 2011 Summer Universiade
Medalists at the 2015 Summer Universiade
Russian Athletics Championships winners